Cape Archer is a cape that marks the north side of the entrance to Granite Harbour on the coast of Victoria Land. Named by the Northern Party of the British Antarctic Expedition (1910–13) for W.W. Archer, chief steward of the expedition.

See also
 Stevens Cliff

References

Headlands of Victoria Land
Scott Coast